The Water Polo Tournament at the 2003 Pan American Games had a men's and a women's competition. The women were competing for the second time at the Pan American Games.

Men's competition

Preliminary round

August 2, 2003

August 3, 2003

August 4, 2003

August 5, 2003

August 6, 2003

August 7, 2003

August 8, 2003

Semi Final Round
August 9, 2003

Final round
August 10, 2003 — 7th place

August 10, 2003 — 5th place

August 10, 2003 — Bronze-medal match

August 10, 2003 — Gold-medal match

Final ranking

Women's competition

Preliminary round

August 3, 2003

August 4, 2003

August 5, 2003

August 6, 2003

August 7, 2003

Semi finals
August 9, 2003

Bronze Medal
August 10, 2003

Gold Medal
August 10, 2003

Final ranking

References
Sports123
UOL results

P
2003
Events at the 2003 Pan American Games
2003